The Dutch Caribbean Securities Exchange (DCSX) is a self-regulatory international Exchange for the listing and trading in domestic and international securities. It is a platform where companies can register for funding and investors can choose companies in which to invest. The DCSX is focused on servicing startups as well as small and medium-sized enterprises.

Structure
The DCSX Foundation functions as the self-regulatory direct supervisory body that assures that Management of the DCSX adheres to the processes as laid down in the Rules and Regulations. It is also the DSCX Foundation that needs to approve new members to the DCSX. The Board of the DCSX Foundation is composed of representatives of financial institutions and or other organizations whose interest it is that Curaçao has a well-functioning securities exchange.

The Board of Directors of the Exchange consists of the CEO, the President of the Board, the Treasurer of the Board and a few Board Members. A Listing Committee is responsible for approving new listings on the Exchange. Arbitration is managed by an Appeals Committee.

Rules and regulations
The DCSX has a set of well-defined rules to regulate and supervise the market and its participants. The rules provide smaller companies with flexibility and easier access to an equity market while providing transparency and strong governance. The DCSX is a regulated membership organization, licensed by the Minister of Finance and supervised by the Central Bank of Curaçao and Sint Maarten. The DCSX follows Curaçao law, which is in concordance with Dutch Law. Final appeals of dispute are heard and decided at the Supreme Court of the Netherlands.

Supervision
The DCSX operates under full license of the Minister of Finance of the Curacao Government and is supervised by the Central Bank of Curaçao and Sint Maarten. The supervision of the Central Bank comprises, among other things, ensuring transparency and business integrity, the proper administrative organization and internal control environment, and the adequate functioning of the securities market and exchange.

Custodian
The DCSX custodial bank is Vidanova Bank N.V. Vidanova Bank N.V.’s majority shareholder (with an equity ownership of > 80 %) is the Vidanova Pension Fund in Curacao.

Participating companies

DCSX members
Algemeen Pensioen Fonds (APC)
PSB Bank N.V.
Banco di Caribe N.V.
Amergeris Global Listing and Exchange Services N.V.
Guardian Group (Fatum Holding N.V.)
Stichting Korporashon pa Desaroyo di Korsou (Korpodeko)
Stichting Ontwikkeling Projecten Logestieke Sector (SLS)
Maduro & Curiel's Bank N.V.
Vidanova Bank N.V.
Stichting Vidanova Pensioen Fonds

DCSX Listing Advisors
Eclipse Management B.V.
Amergeris Global Listing and Exchange Services N.V. 
Maduro & Curiel's Bank N.V.
Trustmoore (Curaçao) N.V.
IQEQ Management (Curaçao) N.V.
VanEps Kunneman VanDoorne
Vistra (Curaçao) N.V.
Untitled Authorised Representatives Ltd.
Biztrack Consultants
EarlyBird Funding B.V.
Isatis Capital Group
Li Chen Long Consulting Limited
SHKL Group Limited
SSC Corporate Services Limited
The Curacao Financial Group N.V.
HBN Law Listing Advisory Services B.V.
PYGG B.V.
Great Vision Capital Limited

DCSX Brokers
Banco di Caribe N.V.
Amergeris Global Listing and Exchange Services N.V.
Maduro & Curiel's Bank N.V.
Vidanova Bank N.V.
EarlyBird Funding B.V.

Affiliations
The 
bloc formed by the Stock Exchanges of: Costa Rica, Ecuador, El Salvador, Guatemala, Honduras, Nicaragua, Panamá and the Dominican Republic which unanimously accepted the application by the D.C.S.E.
 The DCSX is a correspondent member of the World Federation of Exchanges.

See also 
 Central banks and currencies of the Caribbean
 Eastern Caribbean Securities Exchange
 Euronext

References

External links 
 dcsx.cw 

Dutch Caribbean Stock Exchange
Stock exchanges in the Caribbean